Nothing to Undo – Chapter Six is sixth studio album by the German power metal band Metalium, released in 2007.

Track listing
"Spineless Scum" - 1:12
"Spirits" - 3:45
"Mindless" - 4:54
"Straight into Hell" - 3:44
"Mental Blindness" - 6:54
"Heroes Failed" - 3:44
"Way Home" - 6:41
"Dare" - 3:44
"Follow the Sign" - 4:58
"Show Must Go On" - 4:20 (Queen cover)
"Way Home" (Orchestral version) - 6:41 (Japanese edition bonus track)

Personnel
Band members
Henning Basse - lead and backing vocals  
Matthias Lange - guitars, backing vocals
Lars Ratz - bass, backing vocals, producer
Michael Ehré - drums, backing vocals

Additional musicians
Andreas Noether - acoustic guitars
Frank Rohles - guitars
Patrick Felsner - piano
Didi Schulz, Jay Bunnings, Kay Karstens, Stefan Schlabritz - additional vocals

References

External links
Metalium Official Website

Metalium albums
2007 albums
Massacre Records albums